WGGP-LP (106.7 FM) is a radio station licensed to Big Pine Key, Florida, United States.  The station is currently owned by First Baptist Church Big Pine Key.

References

External links
 

GGP-LP
GGP-LP